Belgrandia varica is a species of minute freshwater snail with an operculum, an aquatic gastropod mollusc or micromollusc in the family Hydrobiidae.

Belgrandia varica was previously considered to be extinct, however it has been classified as Critically Endangered (Possibly Extinct) by IUCN because it might still be present in a small spring that has been overlooked during previous surveys.

Distribution 
This species is endemic to France.

References

Further reading 
 Falkner G., Ripken T. E. J. & Falkner M. (2002). Mollusques Continentaux de la France: Liste de Reference Annotee et Bibliographie. Museum national d’Histoire naturelle, Paris.

External links
 

Hydrobiidae
Belgrandia
Endemic molluscs of Metropolitan France
Gastropods described in 1854